The S.C. Geier House is a Colonial Revival style home located in the Angelino Heights Historic Preservation Overlay Zone in Los Angeles, California. It is a  house built in 1907, designed by R. L. Sholty around May of  1906. It was restored in 2005.  It shares lot lines on either side with Los Angeles Cultural Monuments #103 Forthmann Carriage House and #808 the Neutra/Maxwell House.

Houses in Los Angeles
Houses completed in 1907
Los Angeles Historic-Cultural Monuments
Colonial architecture in California